Valentine is a town in Jeff Davis County, Texas, United States. The population was 134 at the 2010 census, down from 187 at the 2000 census.

Description

The town is the only incorporated municipality in Jeff Davis County. Its name refers to the date of its founding in 1882 by a Southern Pacific Railroad construction crew: February 14. It is one of several cities named Valentine in the United States where the U.S. Postal Service cancels envelopes for Valentine's Day.

The Valentine resident and artist Boyd Elder (1944–2018) served as its caretaker.

The John Wayne film Cahill U.S. Marshal, filmed in Durango, Mexico, was set in Valentine, Texas.

The first track of Laurel Hell by Mitski uses the town's name for its title.

Geography

Valentine is located in western Jeff Davis County at  (30.587504, –104.495498), along U.S. Route 90. The highway leads northwest  to Interstate 10 at Van Horn, and southeast  to Marfa.

The town sits in a flat basin between the Davis Mountains  to the east and the Sierra Vieja  to the west.

Demographics

2020 census

As of the 2020 United States census, there were 73 people, 56 households, and 41 families residing in the town.

2000 census
As of the census of 2000, there were 187 people, 72 households, and 55 families residing in the town. The population density was 388.8 people per square mile (150.4/km2). There were 138 housing units at an average density of 286.9 per square mile (111.0/km2).  The racial makeup of the town was 89.84% White, 0.53% African American, 8.02% from other races, and 1.60% from two or more races. Hispanic or Latino of any race were 58.82% of the population.

There were 72 households, out of which 33.3% had children under the age of 18 living with them, 65.3% were married couples living together, 2.8% had a female householder with no husband present, and 23.6% were non-families. 22.2% of all households were made up of individuals, and 13.9% had someone living alone who was 65 years of age or older. The average household size was 2.60 and the average family size was 3.04.

In the town, the population was spread out, with 25.7% under the age of 18, 3.7% from 18 to 24, 24.6% from 25 to 44, 25.1% from 45 to 64, and 20.9% who were 65 years of age or older. The median age was 42 years. For every 100 females, there were 103.3 males. For every 100 females age 18 and over, there were 104.4 males.

The median income for a household in the town was $34,375, and the median income for a family was $38,750. Males had a median income of $22,031 versus $33,333 for females. The per capita income for the town was $16,136. About 12.8% of families and 10.7% of the population were below the poverty line, including 13.2% of those under the age of eighteen and none of those 65 or over.

Climate

Valentine experiences a semi-arid climate (Köppen BSk) with cool, dry winters and hot, dry summers.
Coordinates: 
Elevation:

Government and infrastructure
The United States Postal Service operates the Valentine Post Office. On Valentine's Day many people send postcards to Valentine, Texas. In July 2011 the USPS announced that the post office may close.

Education
Valentine Independent School District is the local district.

All of Jeff Davis County is zoned to Odessa College.

Entertainment

Valentine is home to, as one politician puts it, "the greatest ever West Texas Valentine's Day celebration."  Hosted by the Big Bend Brewing Company of Alpine, Texas, as many as 1,000 people invade Valentine on Valentine's Day from points as close as Valentine itself, Marfa, and Alpine, to far away places such as Chicago and Cleveland. In 2014, the west Texas brewery served free cups of beer while Gary P. Nunn played live on stage, under the moonlit night and stars.

Earthquake
On August 16, 1931, a magnitude 5.8 earthquake struck near Valentine, causing extensive damage. The earthquake was the most powerful ever recorded in Texas.

See also

 List of municipalities in Texas

References

External links

 Handbook of Texas Online article
 West Texas Weekly, a local weekly newspaper

Towns in Texas
Towns in Jeff Davis County, Texas
Populated places established in 1882
1882 establishments in Texas